XXXX is the third full-length album by Canadian dance-punk band You Say Party (formerly You Say Party! We Say Die!), released September 29, 2009. It was the last release featuring the band's original longer name and the last album with drummer Devon Clifford (who died in April 2010).

In addition to the album's title, the word "XXXX" also appears in several of the album's song titles. In each song, the four Xs represent the word "love". In an interview with CBC Radio 3, the band's vocalist Becky Ninkovic explained that when finalizing the cover art for the band's first EP Dansk Wad, she had wanted to leave a personal "mark of love" on it, and settled on signing it with four small Xs.

The album was a longlisted nominee for the 2010 Polaris Music Prize.

Track listing

Production
Band
Becky Ninkovic - vocals, arrangements
Devon Clifford - drums, backing vocals, arrangements
Derek Adam - guitar, backing vocals, arrangements
Krista Loewen - keyboards, vocals, arrangements 
Stephen O'Shea - bass, backing vocals, arrangements

Session members
Shawn Penner - percussion (additional)
Saara Itkonen - backing vocals (additional)
Tamarack Hockin- backing vocals (additional)
Melissa Gregerson - backing vocals (additional), writing, arrangements

Production
Derek Adam - design
Brock McFarlane - engineering (assistant)
Steve Hall - mastering
Ted Gowans - mixing (assistant)
Chris Janzen - other (group dynamic calibrator)
Sharla Sauder - other (vocal coach)
Derek Adam - photography
Devon Clifford - photography
Todd Duym - photography
Shawn Penner - producer
Becky Ninkovic - producer (additional), engineering (additional)
Becky Ninkovic - artwork
Howard Redekopp – producer, engineering, mixing, photography

References 

2009 albums
You Say Party albums
Paper Bag Records albums